Arthur Keegan (6 November 1938 – 3 November 2008), also known by the nickname of "Ollie", was an English professional rugby league footballer who played in the 1950s, 1960s and 1970s, and coached in the 1970s and 1980s. He played at representative level for Great Britain, England and Yorkshire, and at club level for West Town Boys ARLFC (in Dewsbury), Hull F.C. (Heritage No.), Bramley and Batley, as a goal-kicking , i.e. number 1, and was captain of Hull during the 1965–66, 1966–67, 1967–68, 1968–69, 1969–70 and 1970–71 seasons, and coached at representative level for Yorkshire, and at club level for Bramley, after serving in the Duke of Wellington's Regiment.

Background
Arthur Keegan was born in Dewsbury, West Riding of Yorkshire, England, and he died aged 69 in Wakefield, West Yorkshire, England.

Playing career

International honours
Keegan won caps for England while at Hull in 1969 against Wales, and France, and won caps for Great Britain while at Hull in 1966 against Australia (2 matches), in 1967 against France (2 matches), and Australia (3 matches), in 1968 against France, and in 1969 against France.

Challenge Cup Final appearances

County Cup Final appearances
Keegan played  in Hull FC's 7–8 defeat by Hull Kingston Rovers in the 1967–68 Yorkshire County Cup Final during the 1967–68 season at Headingley Rugby Stadium, Leeds on Saturday 14 October 1967.

Coaching career

BBC2 Floodlit Trophy Final appearances
Keegan was the coach in Bramley's 15–7 victory over Widnes in the 1973 BBC2 Floodlit Trophy Final during the 1973–74 season at Naughton Park, Widnes on Tuesday 18 December 1973.

Genealogical information
Arthur Keegan's marriage to Anne (née Bottomley) was registered during fourth ¼ 1966 in Dewsbury district. They had children; Lucy Keegan (birth registered during first ¼  in Dewsbury district), Bridget Keegan (born , birth registered during fourth ¼ 1970 in Dewsbury district), and Amelia Keegan (birth registered during fourth ¼  in Dewsbury district). Arthur Keegan's second marriage was to Jackie. They had children; the twins; Thomas Keegan, and Rhys Keegan born .

References

External links
Obituary at yorkshirepost.co.uk
Tribute to RL legend Arthur Keegan
Tributes to one of the very best
Obituary at johnstonpress.co.uk
Obituary at legacy.com
 (archived by web.archive.org) Stats → Past Players → K at hullfc.com
 (archived by web.archive.org) Statistics at hullfc.com

1938 births
2008 deaths
Batley Bulldogs players
Bramley R.L.F.C. coaches
Bramley RLFC players
Duke of Wellington's Regiment soldiers
England national rugby league team players
English rugby league coaches
English rugby league players
Great Britain national rugby league team players
Hull F.C. captains
Hull F.C. players
Rugby league fullbacks
Rugby league players from Dewsbury
Yorkshire rugby league team coaches
Yorkshire rugby league team players